James E. Williams (1930–1999) was an American law enforcement officer and honorary United States Navy chief boatswain's mate.

James E. Williams may also refer to:

James E. Williams (Atlanta mayor), antebellum mayor of Atlanta, Georgia
James E. Williams (East St. Louis mayor), mayor of East St. Louis, Illinois
USS James E. Williams, naval vessel of the United States Navy